Peperomia yutajensis is a species of plant from the genus 'Peperomia'. It was discovered by Julian Alfred Steyermark in Venezuela, 1984.

References

yutajensis
Flora of South America
Flora of Venezuela
Plants described in 1984
Taxa named by Julian Alfred Steyermark